Romanogobio elimeius is a species of ray-finned fish in the family Cyprinidae. It is found in Greece and North Macedonia. Its natural habitat is rivers. It is threatened by habitat loss.

References

Romanogobio
Fish described in 1973
Taxonomy articles created by Polbot
Taxa named by Alexander I. Stephanidis